Patricia Newton Moller (born 1944) is a retired investment banker and American diplomat who became a business consultant.  Her company, Moller Global Advisory LLC, helps companies that want to do business in developing countries. Moller worked as an investment banker with Smith Barney Harris Upham before working for the State Department.

Biography 
Moller was Ambassador Extraordinary and Plenipotentiary to Guinea from March 26, 2010, until September 12, 2012.  She was Ambassador to Burundi (March 4, 2006-June 2009).  She was also Deputy Chief of Mission (DCM) to Georgia (country).

Moller earned a bachelor's degree in history from the University of Tampa.

References

See also
Article on Wikipedia Germany

Living people
American women ambassadors
American investment bankers
Ambassadors of the United States to Burundi
Ambassadors of the United States to Guinea
1944 births
University of Tampa alumni
21st-century American diplomats
21st-century American women